The Hellenic Air Force Museum was founded in 1986 and since 1992 has been located on Dekelia Air Base in Acharnes north of Athens. In opposition to the War Museum of Athens it displays air force history and is active in restoring and presenting old aircraft. Most aircraft in the collection come from the Hellenic Air Force; some were exchanged with other European aircraft museums.

The HAF Underwater Operations Team (KOSYTHE) helped recover some rare aircraft from underwater for the museum: a Bristol Blenheim, a Junkers Ju 52/3m and a Junkers Ju 87.

Aircraft on display 

 Agusta-Bell 47J-2 Ranger
 Agusta-Bell 206A Jet Ranger II
 Bell OH-13 Sioux
 Canadair CL-13 Sabre Mk.2
 Canadair CL-13 Sabre Mk.2
 Canadair CL-13 Sabre Mk.2
 Canadair CL-13 Sabre Mk.2
 Cessna T-37B Tweet
 Cessna T-37C Tweet
 Convair TF-102A Delta Dagger
 Convair TF-102A Delta Dagger
 Curtiss SB2C-5 Helldiver
 Dassault Mirage F1CG
 De Havilland DH.82A Tiger Moth
 Douglas C-47B Dakota
 Dornier Do-28D-2 Skyservant
 Dornier Do-28D-2 Skyservant
 Grumman G-159 Gulfstream I
 Grumman HU-16B Albatross
 Grumman HU-16B Albatross
 Lockheed F-104G Starfighter
 Lockheed F-104G Starfighter
 Lockheed F-104G Starfighter
 Lockheed TF-104G Starfighter
 Lockheed T-33A
 Lockheed T-33A
 LTV A-7E Corsair II
 LTV A-7E Corsair II
 LTV A-7H Corsair II
 McDonnell Douglas RF-4E Phantom II
 Mignet HM.14
 Northrop F-5A Freedom Fighter
 Northrop RF-5A Tigereye
 Nord N.2501 Noratlas
 North American F-86D Sabre
 North American T-6G Texan
 Republic F-84F Thunderstreak
 Republic F-84G Thunderjet
 Republic RF-84F Thunderflash
 Sikorsky UH-19B Chickasaw
 Supermarine Spitfire Mk IXc
 WSK-1 Mielec Lim-2Rbis

Unrestored aircraft

  Arado Ar 196 A-5
  Bristol Blenheim Mk IVF
  Junkers Ju 52/mg8e
  Junkers Ju 87 D-3

References

External links 
 Museum webpage
 Pictures of the exhibition

Museums in Athens
Air force museums
Museums established in 1986
Military and war museums in Greece
Transport museums in Greece
1986 establishments in Greece
Museum